Sergey Petrovich Yurizditsky (born April 21, 1947, Sochi) is a Russian cinematographer. Honored Artist of Russia (1994). 

Member of the Union of Cinematographers of the Russian Federation, and European Film Academy.

Selected filmography 
 The Lonely Voice of Man  (1978) 
 The Degraded  (1980) 
 Mournful Unconcern  (1983) 
 Days of Eclipse  (1988) 
 Save and Protect  (1989) 
 Humiliated and Insulted (1990)
 The Castle (1994)
 Streets of Broken Lights   (1997)
 The Captain's Daughter (2000)
 Remote Access (2004)
 Family Name (2006)

References

External links

 Sergey Yurizditsky at KinoPoisk

1938 births
Living people
People from Sochi
Soviet cinematographers
Russian cinematographers
Gerasimov Institute of Cinematography alumni